The Glacier Discovery is a passenger train operated by the Alaska Railroad between the towns of Anchorage, Whittier Alaska and south on the Seward rail line as far as Grandview whistle stop; then back again. It is a seasonal train, only operating between the months of May and September.


Station Stops
The Glacier Discovery utilizes part of the Anchorage–Seward route. It makes the following station stops:

 Anchorage
 Girdwood
 Portage
 Whittier
 Portage
 Spencer Whistle Stop
 Grandview Whistle Stop

After the stop at Grandview the train travels back again: 
 Spencer Whistle Stop
 Portage
 Whittier
 Portage
 Girdwood
 Anchorage

Rolling Stock 

The Glacier Discovery consist uses the following rolling stock

 1 EMD GP38-2
 1baggage car
 1-3 single level passenger cars
 1 Colorado Railcar bi level DMU 751

Notes
A.  Return travelers are offered the opportunity to transfer to a motorcoach in Portage, taking them directly back to Anchorage and allowing them to skip the train's return detour to Whittier.

References

External links
Alaska Railroad home page
Map of Alaska Railroad with Glacier Discovery route marked in blue

Passenger trains of the Alaska Railroad
Passenger rail transportation in Alaska